McCormick Cabin Site is a historic site located at Indianapolis, Indiana.  It is the site of the cabin John Wesley McCormick (1754–1837) built in 1820.  It was at the cabin that commissioners appointed by the Indiana legislature met in June 1820 to select the site for the permanent seat of state government at Indianapolis. The site is commemorated by a granite boulder in White River State Park with plaque erected in 1924.

It was listed on the National Register of Historic Places in 1981.

References

Monuments and memorials on the National Register of Historic Places in Indiana
Archaeological sites on the National Register of Historic Places in Indiana
Houses completed in 1820
Buildings and structures in Indianapolis
National Register of Historic Places in Indianapolis
White River State Park